Silver Oliver may refer to:

 Silver Oliver (1736–1798), Irish MP and Privy Counsellor
 Silver Oliver (1770–1834), Irish MP
 Charles Silver Oliver (died 1817), Irish MP
 William Silver Oliver (1836–1908), Irish military surgeon